Alpine Investments BV v Minister van Financiën (1995) C-384/93 is an EU law case, concerning the free movement of services in the European Union.

Facts
Alpine Investments BV claimed that the Dutch Ministry of Finance should not have prohibited it on 1 October 1991 from ‘cold calling’ to sell commodities futures without prior consent from customers, because this was an unjustifiable restriction on freedom to provide services under TFEU article 56 (ex article 49 TEEC). Alpine, which place orders with Merrill Lynch, offered portfolio management, investment advice and the transmission of clients’ orders to brokers operating on commodities futures markets. The Wet Effectenhandel (Law on Securities Transactions) of 30 October 1985, article 6(1) required a licence to be an intermediary and art 8(2) said it could be restricted to prevent ‘undesirable developments in securities trading.’ The Ministry got numerous complaints, including people from other member states, and he acted to preserve the Dutch financial sector's reputation. In January 1992 it got authorisation to place orders with another broker, Rodham & Renshaw, but still with a prohibition on cold calling.

The Dutch Administrative Court referred to the ECJ asking whether protection of consumers and protecting the Dutch securities trading reputation could be a public interest reason to stop cold calling, and whether a ban was necessary. It was common ground that this was services under art 60 TEEC as it was for remuneration.

Judgment
The Court of Justice held that Alpine Investments BV could be restrained from "cold calling" because the rules were likely justified on grounds of consumer protection and preserving the Dutch financial sector's good reputation.

See also

European Union law
home state regulation

Notes

References

European Union services case law
1995 in the Netherlands
1995 in case law
Telemarketing